Kentucky Route 1072 (KY 1072) is  state highway in the Northern Kentucky area.

Route description
KY 1072 begins at a roundabout with Megellan Road and Howe Road near a Fidelity Investments office building near Fort Wright, heading northwest on two-lane undivided Highland Pike. The road curves southwest and northwest again through wooded areas and comes to a bridge over a CSX railroad line. The route widens to four lanes and comes to an intersection with KY 17 in a commercial area. KY 1072 becomes a five-lane road with a center left-turn lane and passes more businesses. The route narrows to three lanes with two northbound lanes and one southbound lane as it heads north through woodland. The road curves to the northeast and passes through residential neighborhoods and comes to an intersection with the western terminus of KY 3187. Here, KY 1072 heads north as Kyles Lane, a three-lane road with a center left-turn lane that passes more homes. The route widens into a four-lane road as it comes to an interchange with Interstate 71 (I-71) and I-75. Immediately after, the road intersects U.S. Route 25 (US 25), US 42, and US 127 in a commercial area.

At this point, KY 1072 turns northeast to form a brief concurrency with US 25/US 42/US 127 on Dixie Highway. KY 1072 splits by heading north onto two-lane undivided Sleepy Hollow Road and passes homes. The road winds north into wooded areas and curves to the northwest. The route passes under a Norfolk Southern railroad line and heads into Ludlow. Here, KY 1072 passes residences before coming to its northern terminus at KY 8 near the Ohio River.

Major intersections

References

External links

1072
Transportation in Kenton County, Kentucky